Dorjee Dazom Bhutia is a Sikkim Democratic Front politician from Sikkim. He was elected in Sikkim Legislative Assembly election in 2014 from Barfung constituency as candidate of Sikkim Democratic Front. He was minister of Energy & Power and Labour in Pawan Chamling fifth ministry from 2014 to 2019.

References 

Living people
Sikkim MLAs 2009–2014
Sikkim MLAs 2014–2019
Sikkim Democratic Front politicians
Year of birth missing (living people)
People from Gangtok